Bruce James Ennis (c. 1940 – 2000) was an American civil rights attorney and founder of the law firm Ennis, Friedman, Bersoff & Ewing, which merged into Jenner & Block in 1988. In 1997, he was awarded the Freedom to Read Foundation Roll of Honor

References

2000 deaths
American lawyers
American Civil Liberties Union people
Dartmouth College alumni
University of Chicago Law School alumni
Year of birth uncertain
People associated with Jenner & Block